Matthew Lloyd (born 24 May 1983) is an Australian former professional road bicycle racer, who rode professionally between 2007 and 2014. Lloyd is the first Australian cyclist to win a King of the Mountains competition in a grand tour.

Career
He turned professional in 2007 with the  team, after riding for the SouthAustralia.com–AIS team. He was an Australian Institute of Sport scholarship holder.

Major results
Source:

2004
 9th Overall Herald Sun Tour
1st Stage 12 
2005
 1st  National Under-23 Criterium Championships
 1st  Overall Tour of Wellington
1st Stage 5
 3rd Grafton–Inverell 
 7th Overall Herald Sun Tour
2006
 1st Trofeo Alcide Degasperi
 1st Stage 5 Tour of Japan
 Herald Sun Tour
1st  Mountains classification
1st Stage 5
 1st Stage 5 Tour of Wellington
 3rd Overall Girobio
 5th GP Capodarco
2007
 4th Overall Tour Down Under
2008
 1st  Road race, National Road Championships
 4th Giro dell'Emilia
 7th Overall Settimana Internazionale di Coppi e Bartali
2010
 Giro d'Italia
1st  Mountains classification
1st Stage 6
2012
 2nd Road race, National Road Championships

Grand Tour general classification results timeline

References

External links 

Palmares on Cycling Base (French)

Australian male cyclists
1983 births
Living people
Cyclists at the 2008 Summer Olympics
Olympic cyclists of Australia
Australian Giro d'Italia stage winners
People educated at Brighton Grammar School
Cyclists from Melbourne
Australian Institute of Sport cyclists